Carlo Girolamo Bersotti (born Pavia, 1645 -died 1700s) was an Italian painter, active during the Baroque period in Milan. He was a pupil of Carlo Sacchi (1617-1703), and painted mainly landscapes, still lifes, and animals. Also called Borsotti.

References

1645 births
17th-century Italian painters
Italian male painters
18th-century Italian painters
Italian Baroque painters
Italian still life painters
Italian painters of animals
Year of death unknown
Artists from Pavia
18th-century Italian male artists